The 1925 NFL season was the sixth regular season of the National Football League. Five new teams entered the league: New York Giants, Detroit Panthers, Pottsville Maroons, Providence Steam Roller, and a new Canton Bulldogs team. The Kenosha Maroons folded, with the Racine Legion and Minneapolis Marines mothballing.

Teams
Twenty teams competed in the NFL during the 1925 season.

1925 NFL Championship controversy

Controversy surrounds who actually won the 1925 NFL Championship. Officially, the Chicago Cardinals are listed as the 1925 NFL champions because they finished with the best record; however, many Pottsville fans at the time claimed that the Maroons were the legitimate champions. The Maroons and the Cardinals were the top contenders for the title, with Pottsville winning a late-season meeting between them, 21–7. But the Maroons scheduled a game against a team of University of Notre Dame All-Stars in Philadelphia (and winning 9–7) on the same day that the Frankford Yellow Jackets were scheduled to play a game in the same city. Frankford protested, saying that it was violating their protected territory rights.

Although NFL president Joe Carr warned the Maroons in writing that they faced suspension if they played in Philadelphia, the Maroons claimed that Carr had previously approved the game during a telephone call, and played anyway. In response, Carr fined the club, suspended it from all league rights and privileges (including the right to play for the NFL championship), and returned its franchise to the league.

In 2003, the NFL decided to again examine the case regarding the 1925 championship. In October of that year, the NFL voted 30–2 not to reopen the case, with only Philadelphia and Pittsburgh, the league's two Pennsylvania-based teams, voting in favor. Thus, the Cardinals are still listed as the 1925 NFL champions.

Had the current (post-1972) system of counting ties as half a win and half a loss been in place in 1925, the Maroons would have won the championship with a win percentage of .833, while the Cardinals would have finished runner-up at .821.

Standings

All star team
NFL league president Joseph Carr chose an all-star team for 1925, including players from Red Grange's tour.

Ends
Lynn dog, New York Giants
Paul G. Goebel, Columbus Tigers

Tackles
Ed Healey, Chicago Bears
Link Lyman, Cleveland Bulldogs

Guards
Butch Spagna, Frankfort Yellow Jackets
John Alexander, New York Giants

Center
Herb Stein, Pottsville Maroons

Quarterback
Joey Sternaman, Chicago Bears

Halfbacks
Red Grange, Chicago Bears
Red Barron, Coral Gables All-Stars

Fullback
Jack McBride, New York Giants

References

 NFL Record and Fact Book
 NFL History 1921–1930 (Last accessed December 4, 2005)
 Total Football: The Official Encyclopedia of the National Football League

 
1925